Kristin Konstandopoulos (born 10 October 1998), is an Australian professional footballer who plays as a midfielder for Adelaide Olympic.

Personal life
Konstandopoulos was born in Australia and is of Greek descent, and his brother Nathan is also a professional footballer.

References

External links

1998 births
Living people
Australian soccer players
Australian people of Greek descent
Soccer players from Adelaide
Association football midfielders
Adelaide United FC players
National Premier Leagues players
A-League Men players
FK Beograd (Australia) players